The Women's 5 kilometre cross-country skiing event was part of the cross-country skiing programme at the 1968 Winter Olympics, in Grenoble, France. It was the second appearance of the event. The competition was held on 13 February 1968, at Autrans.

Results

References

Women's cross-country skiing at the 1968 Winter Olympics
Women's 5 kilometre cross-country skiing at the Winter Olympics
Oly
Cross